The 2020 Clemson Tigers softball team was the varsity college softball team that represented Clemson University during the 2020 NCAA Division I softball season.  This was the first season of Clemson's softball program.  The Tigers competed in the Atlantic Coast Conference (ACC) and were led by head coach John Rittman.  Clemson played its home games at Clemson Softball Stadium in Clemson, South Carolina.

The season was impacted by the coronavirus pandemic.  On March 12, it was announced that the 2020 NCAA tournament would be canceled due to the pandemic.  Clemson University suspended all events until April 5, 2020. On March 17, the ACC cancelled all spring athletic activities and thereby ended the softball season. The Tigers finished the season 19–8 and 5–1 in ACC play.

Personnel

Roster

Coaches

Schedule

References

Clemson
Clemson Tigers softball seasons
Clemson softball